Grosso mogul, also Il grosso mogul, or capitalised [Il] Grosso Mogul ([The] Great Moghul), RV 208, is a violin concerto in D major by Antonio Vivaldi. The concerto, in three movements, is an early work by the Venetian composer. Around the mid-1710s Johann Sebastian Bach transcribed the concerto for organ, BWV 594, in C major. A simplified version of the violin concerto, RV 208a, without the elaborated cadenzas that appear in manuscript versions of RV 208, and with a different middle movement, was published around 1720 in Amsterdam as concerto #11 of Vivaldi's Op. 7.

History
Vivaldi's violin concerto in D major, RV 208, survives in three manuscripts:
 Vivaldi's autograph score, conserved in Turin.
 Another copy of the parts conserved in Cividale del Friuli.

The Grosso Mogul title appears on the Schwerin manuscript, which was written before 1717. According to Michael Talbot, the name of the concerto can possibly be linked to Domenico Lalli's Il gran Mogol opera libretto, a setting of which had been presented in Naples in 1713. Later settings of this libretto include Giovanni Porta's, staged in Venice in 1717, and Vivaldi's RV 697 (1730).

The Schwerin and Cividale del Friuli copies of the concerto contain two variants of extended cadenzas for unaccompanied violin, in the first and last movements of the concerto. The autograph version indicates where such cadenzas can be inserted in these movements, but does not contain the cadenzas. A manuscript with the written-out cadenzas must have been circulating before  when Bach transcribed such version for solo organ (BWV 594).

This version has a different middle movement than the RV 208 version. Vivaldi seems to have had no supervision over the Op. 7 collection, published around 1720 in Amsterdam by the Roger firm, in which the older RV 208a version of the concerto was retained. This version of the concerto does not contain the extended cadenzas, nor an indication where such cadenzas could be inserted.

Movements
The concerto has been transmitted in a version for violin soloist, strings (two violin parts and one viola part), and basso continuo. It has three movements:
 Allegro, D major
 Recitative: Grave, B minor – this movement is performed by the violin soloist exclusively accompanied by the thoroughbass.
 Allegro, D major

First movement

The first movement, in D Major is in Ritornello form. The first solo episode consists of sixteenth notes, with double stops on every beat.

Second movement
The second movement, in B Minor is for the solo violin and basso continuo. There are strange rhythms, like improvisation.

Third movement
The third movement, in D Major, is in Ritornello form, and is the most virtuosic of the 3 movements.

Reception

References

Sources

External links
 
 Concerto III in C Major (BWV 594) for Flute & Strings • Vivaldi Concerto for Violin in D RV208a: Scores at MuseScore website

Concertos by Antonio Vivaldi
Cultural depictions of Akbar
Works about Mughal Empire
Works about Indian history